Adel Al-Sulaimane (Arabic:عادل السليماني) (born 25 August 1995) is a Qatari footballer. He currently plays for Umm Salal .

External links

References

Qatari footballers
1995 births
Living people
Qatar Stars League players
Umm Salal SC players
Al-Wakrah SC players
Place of birth missing (living people)
Aspire Academy (Qatar) players
Association football midfielders